NGC 712 is a lenticular galaxy located 230 million light-years away in the constellation Andromeda. It was discovered by astronomer John Herschel in October 1828 and is a member of Abell 262.

See also
 List of NGC objects (1–1000)

References

External links

712
6988
Andromeda (constellation)
Astronomical objects discovered in 1828
Lenticular galaxies
Abell 262
1352
Discoveries by John Herschel